The  is a commuter electric multiple unit (EMU) train type operated by the private railway operator Kintetsu since 2002.

Operations
The 6820 series sets operate on Minami Osaka Line services.

Formations
, the fleet consists of two two-car sets, formed as follows, with one motored (Mc) car and one non-powered trailer (Tc) car, and the "Mc" car at the Yoshino end.

The "Mc" car is fitted with two single-arm pantographs.

Interior
Passenger accommodation consists of longitudinal bench seating throughout.

See also
 Kintetsu 9020 series, similar  gauge trainset.

References

External links

 Kintetsu "Series 21" (3220/5820/9020/9820/6820 series) train information 

Electric multiple units of Japan
6820 series
Train-related introductions in 2002

ja:近鉄9020系電車#6820系
Kinki Sharyo multiple units
1500 V DC multiple units of Japan